Shorabil Lake (Persian: دریاچه شورابیل) is a lake located in a hilly area south of the Iranian city of Ardabil. Ardabil University is located near the lake.
The surface of the lake is 640,000 m2, and is covered with a thin white layer of minerals which are useful in healing skin diseases and rheumatism. The leisure complex of Shorabil is located near the lake. The lake is ringed by a scenic roadway offering views of the lake and the nearby Sabalan mountain.

The basin was covered with mud and high concentrations of salt and other minerals so that no fish could survive. In 1998, the government of Ardabil started diluting the lake water by linking rivers from the surrounding area. After almost 2 years they also started growing a kind of fish called "ghezel-aala" in the lake which is famous for having pink meat and wonderful taste. In 1999 a floating restaurant was built and placed in the middle of the lake. which was transferred to the government but it was later shifted to the shore as they could not handle the maintenance and other technical difficulties.

Geo-co-ordinates

Latitude = 38.2126, Longitude = 48.2870
Lat = 38 degrees,   12.8 minutes   North
Long = 48 degrees,   17.2 minutes   East

References

External links

 http://www.shorabil.com/
 More Pictures, Tishineh
 http://www.irantourismcenter.com/?page_id=7426

Lakes of Iran
Landforms of Ardabil Province